Marie Baum (23 March 1874 – 8 August 1964), was a German politician of the German Democratic Party (DDP) and social activist. She was one of the first female members of the Weimar National Assembly. She was a pioneer within German welfare and workers security.

Marie Baum was born in Danzig, West Prussia, German Empire (Gdańsk, Poland). She studied chemistry at the University of Zürich, where she met Ricarda Huch. From 1897 to 1899 she worked at the ETH Zürich, afterwards she moved to Berlin, where she started to engage in politics and social welfare in 1902. In 1919, representing the German Democratic Party, she was elected a member of the Weimar National Assembly for Schleswig-Holstein.

Works
 Grundriss der Gesundheitsfürsorge, München 1923
 Familienfürsorge, Karlsruhe 1928
 Das Familienleben in der Gegenwart. 182 Familienmonographien, Berlin 1930
 Rückblick auf mein Leben, Heidelberg 1950
 Leuchtende Spur. Das Leben Ricarda Huchs, Tübingen 1950
 Aus einem Lebensbild Anna von Gierkes, in: Mädchenbildung und Frauenschaffen, Heft 2/1952, Seiten 1–12.
 Anna von Gierke. Ein Lebensbild, Weinheim/Basel 1954
 Introduction to The Diary of Anne Frank, Amsterdam 1950

References

1874 births
1964 deaths
Politicians from Gdańsk
People from West Prussia
German Democratic Party politicians
Members of the Weimar National Assembly
20th-century German women politicians